Mount Scio is a provincial electoral district in Newfoundland and Labrador. As of 2011 there are 14,482 people living in the district.

Mount Scio includes part of the town of Paradise and part of the city of St. John's. The district was created following the 2015 electoral districts boundaries review. The majority of Mount Scio was previously the district of St. John's North. The district also includes parts of the former districts of Mount Pearl North, St. John's East and Topsail.

Former Liberal Cabinet Minister Dale Kirby was the district's MHA from 2015 until he retired in 2019. Sarah Stoodley, a insurance firm communications specialist, was elected for the Liberal Party in 2019.

Members of the House of Assembly

Election results

|-

|-

|-

References

Newfoundland and Labrador provincial electoral districts
Politics of St. John's, Newfoundland and Labrador